Pensions in Vietnam are provided through a state pension scheme called social insurance, and private life insurance-type schemes. The pension system of Vietnam was ranked 57th out of 70 economies according to a 2020 Allianz report. As of 2020, 11.4% of Vietnamese have reached retirement age, but this number is expected to triple by 2050.

Retirement age 
The current retirement age is 60 years for men and 55 for women. Starting January 1, 2021, this will be increased to 62 for men and 60 for women. People employed in dangerous or physically demanding jobs may retire earlier, whereas those in highly skilled jobs may not retire over 5 years the general retirement age.

State contributory pensions 
The state pension system, called social insurance, is administered by the government's Social Insurance Agency (SIA). Both public and private sector employees are required to participate, though small businesses often ignore it. A small fixed percentage of an employee's salary is paid to the SIA every month. Upon reaching retirement, the worker is entitled to receive a repayment contributions in a lump sum, or, if they contributed to the SIA for 20 years or more, a lifetime pension. Social insurance pensions are insufficient to live on, and the vast majority of elderly people in Vietnam still depend on their families to care for them regardless of whether or not they receive a pension.

History 
A state pension scheme as part of the social insurance system has existed since 1962 (North Vietnam), but up to 1995 only covered state-owned enterprise workers.

Funding 
Public servants, state-owned enterprise workers, and contract-based private sector workers are subject to mandatory pension contributions of 22%, of which 14% is paid by employers and 8% is paid by employees. For other workers, including Vietnamese abroad and foreigners, this is voluntary. As of 2014, a total of 11.5 million Vietnamese workers paid pension contributions.

State non-contributory pensions 
Elderly people without pensions who live in extreme poverty can get assistance from other government programs, though these are generally not well-funded. For those over 80 and/or disabled, the benefits are higher, starting at VND 180,000 (about $9.5 in 2010). As of 2012, 1.43 million elderly were receiving these benefits.

Private pensions
People can also choose to contribute additional funds to life insurance schemes, and receive either lump sum or pension payments when retiring, though this is uncommon among low-income workers.

References

Vietnam
Wealth in Vietnam